George Brudenell-Bruce may refer to:

George Brudenell-Bruce, 2nd Marquess of Ailesbury (1804–1878)
George Brudenell-Bruce, 4th Marquess of Ailesbury (1863–1894)
George Brudenell-Bruce, 6th Marquess of Ailesbury (1873–1961)

See also
Brudenell-Bruce
George Brudenell (disambiguation)
George Bruce (disambiguation)